This is a list of notable Turkish Bulgarians who were born in Bulgaria (during the Ottoman or post-Ottoman periods) as well as people of full or partial Turkish Bulgarian origin. In addition to notable Bulgarian citizens of Turkish origin, there are many notable Turkish Bulgarian individuals who either emigrated to, or were born in, Turkey and thus have Turkish citizenship.

Academia and medicine
 
, physician
 , Turkish researcher and librarian (born in Razgrad) 
Ahmet Cevdet, Ottoman scholar, intellectual, bureaucrat, administrator, and historian
İsmail Fenni Ertuğrul, Turkish philosopher (born in Ottoman Veliko Tarnovo) 
, Turkish sociologist, soldier and politician (born in Momchilgrad)
, agronomist
, Turkish child from Bulgaria adopted and Christened by Russian soldiers during the Russo-Turkish War (1877–1878); she became a nurse during World War I
, Turkish architect (born in Vidin) 
Tahsin Özgüç, Turkish archaeologist
Nesrin Özören, Turkish biologist (born in Silistra) 
Osman Nuri Peremeci, historian
, writer and journalist 
, Turkish pathologist 
İsmail Hakkı Tonguç, Turkish General Director of Primary Education
Ibrahim Yalamov, historian
, philosopher

Activism
Nuri Turgut Adalı, activist and writer also a prisoner of the Belene labour camp

Arts and literature
 
 
Sabahattin Ali, Ottoman and Turkish writer, poet, journalist
, Turkish writer (born in Razgrad) 
, Turkish poet (born in Yabalkovets)
Ahmet Emin Atasoy, Turkish poet, author and interpreter (born in Targovishte)
, journalist  
, theater director
, painter and porcelain artist
, writer
, writer
, Turkish writer (born in Krumovgrad)
, poet, artist and translator; he set himself on fire in protest against the "Revival Process"
Kemal Kurt, Turkish-born German author, translator and photographer (Turkish Bulgarian origin)
, poet 
, Turkish writer (born in Ottoman Bulgaria) 
Ertuğrul Özkök,  Turkish journalist and a daily columnist (Turkish Bulgarian parents from Kardzhali)
Sevda Shishmanova, producer, director and journalist
, Turkish writer and poet (born in Razgrad)
, writer
, writer
, writer
, Turkish writer (born in Shumen)
, journalist

Aviation
Nezihe Viranyalı, one of the first Turkish female aviators (born in Vidin)

Cinema and television
 
 

, Turkish actor (paternally of Turkish Bulgarian origin)
Gülsim Ali, Turkish actress and model (born in Ruse)
, actor
Zahari Baharov, actor
Alina Boz, Russian-born actress (Turkish Bulgarian father)
İbrahim Büyükak, Turkish actor (Turkish Bulgarian parents)
Cengiz Coşkun, Turkish actor (Turkish Bulgarian parents) 
, actor
Fahradin Fahradinov, actor
Cansu Dere, Turkish actress (Turkish Bulgarian parents)
İlhan Şen, actor (born in Shumen)
, actor 
, Turkish actor (born in Vidin) 
Tardu Flordun, Turkish actor (Turkish Bulgarian father) 
Ozan Güven, German-born actor (Turkish Bulgarian origin)
İsmail Hacıoğlu, Turkish actor
, actress
Bade İşçil, Turkish actress (partial Turkish Bulgarian origin)
Yuksel Kadriev, bTV news anchor
Hulusi Kentmen, Turkish actor (born in Veliko Tarnovo)
Hülya Koçyiğit, Turkish actress (Turkish Bulgarian parents) 
Fikret Kuşkan, Turkish actor (Turkish Bulgarian mother) 
, TV presenter 
Şaziye Moral, Turkish female stage and film actress (born in Kardzhali) 
Demet Özdemir, Turkish actress, (Turkish Bulgarian origin) 
Yavuz Selekman, Turkish actor and Olympic wrestler (Turkish Bulgarian origin) 
Gülhan Şen, Turkish television presenter (born in Shumen)
, screenwriter 
Tuğba Melis Türk, Turkish actress and model; winner of Best Model of Turkey (2011) (born in Sofia) 
Tuvana Türkay, Turkish actress (Turkish Bulgarian father)
Çağatay Ulusoy, Turkish actor (Turkish Bulgarian father) 
Şoray Uzun, Turkish comedian, writer and television host (born in Razgrad)
, Turkish actress (born in Ruse) 
Hakan Yildiz, actor
Alican Yücesoy, Turkish actor (Turkish Bulgarian mother)

Design
Günay Erdem, Turkish architect (born in Shumen)
Sunay Erdem, Turkish architect (born in Shumen)

Food
Silvena Rowe, British celebrity chef and food writer (Turkish Bulgarian father)

Military
 
Nihat Anılmış, officer of the Ottoman Army and a general of the Turkish Army (born in Plovdiv)
Ahmet Nuri Diriker, Turkish Brigadier General who fought in the Gallipoli Campaign (born in Ruse)
, participant in the communist resistance movement during World War II
Abdülkerim Nadir Pasha, Ottoman military commander (born in Chirpan)
Mehmet Hayri Tarhan, officer of the Ottoman Army and a general of the Turkish Army (born in Malko Tarnovo)
Ömer Fahreddin Türkkan,  Turkish career officer who was the commander of the Ottoman Army and governor of Medina from 1916 to 1919 (born in Ruse)

Music
 
 
, singer
Reyhan Angelova, singer
, singer 
Ciguli, Turkish musician (born in Haskovo) 
, singer and songwriter
Fiki, pop-folk singer
, Turkish singer (born in Bulgaria)
, drummer, jazz artist, producer, and songwriter
Yıldız İbrahimova, jazz musician and folk singer
Hasan Ignatov, pianist (Turkish Bulgarian mother)
Ibrahim Ignatov, pianist (Turkish Bulgarian mother) 
, member of the Bulgarian rock band Wickeda 
, singer 
, folk musician 
Hikmet Mehmedov, choreographer
, conductor 
, singer 
, Turkish jazz musician, pianist , saxophonist and composer (Turkish Bulgarian father)
, singer 
Toni Storaro, leading performer on the Bulgarian music label Diapason Records
Suzanitta, chalga singer
Derya Uluğ, Turkish actress (partial Turkish Bulgarian origin)

Politics
 
 

Hassan Ademov, member of the DPS party
, Mayor of Dulovo municipality 
, member of the DPS
Nedzhmi Ali, member of the DPS party and an elected Member of the European Parliament
, member of the DPS
, member of the DPS; Mayor of Antonovo municipality
Atidzhe Alieva-Veli,  member of the DPS party and an elected Member of the European Parliament (2019–present) 
, member of the DPS; Mayor of Sitovo municipality
,  member of the Bulgarian Communist Party (BCP); Deputy Prime Minister in 1989-1990
,member of the DPS
, Mayor of the Municipality of Kardzhali since 2003, municipal leader of the DPS in Kardzhali
Celâl Bayar, 3rd Prime Minister of Turkey (1937–39) and 3rd President of Turkey (1950–60) (Turkish Bulgarian father from Lom Ottoman Bulgaria) 
, member of the DPS
Rıza Tevfik Bölükbaşı, Ottoman and Turkish philosopher, poet and politician  
, mayor of Glavinitsa Municipality 
, member of the DPS
, member of the DPS
, member of the DPS; Deputy Minister of Foreign Affairs (2005–08); Deputy Minister of Youth and Sports (2003–05)
, member of the DPS
, former member of the DPS; Minister of Agriculture and Forestry (2001–05)
, member of the Bulgarian Communist Party (BCP)
Ali Dinçer, Turkish politician; former Mayor of Ankara (1977–80) and Minister of State (1995-96) (born in Razgrad)
Ahmed Dogan, chairman of the Movement for Rights and Freedoms party (1990-2013)
, member of the DPS
, politician
, Trade Minister of Turkey (1947–48)
, member of the DPS
, member of the DPS
, member of the EPP; Mayor of Glavinitsa municipality
, member of the DPS
, Mayor of Loznitsa
Tunalı Hilmi, Ottoman and Turkish politician (born in Ottoman Targovishte)
Filiz Husmenova, member of the DPS party and an elected Member of the European Parliament (2007-2019)
, regional Governor of Razgrad
, member of the Central Committee of the Bulgarian Communist Party
, member of the DPS
İsmet İnönü,  1st Prime Minister of Turkey (1923–24; 1925–37; 1961–65) and 2nd President of Turkey (1938-1950) (Turkish Bulgarian mother from Razgrad) 
, former member of the DPS
, chairman of the People's Party Freedom and Dignity (VVD)
, member of the DPS
Nihat Kabil, former Ministry of Agriculture and Forestry of Bulgaria (2005–08)
, member of the Bulgarian Communist Party (BCP)
Mustafa Karadaya, chairman of the Movement for Rights and Freedoms
, member of the DPS
Metin Kazak,  member of the DPS party and an elected Member of the European Parliament (2007–14)
Tchetin Kazak, member of the DPS party and an elected Member of the European Parliament (2007–present)
Ilhan Kyuchyuk, President of the Youth Movement for Rights and Freedoms since 2005; elected Member of the European Parliament (2014-present)
, member of the DPS
Lyutvi Mestan, founder of the Democrats for Responsibility, Solidarity and Tolerance
, member of the DPS; former Chairwoman of the State Agency for Child Protection (2001–09)
, member of the DPS
, member of the DPS
, member of the DPS
, deputy chairman of the DPS
Vezhdi Rashidov, member of the GERB party and the former Minister of Culture of Bulgaria (2009–13)
, member of the DPS; Mayor of Opaka municipality
, member of the DPS; Mayor of Omurtag municipality
, member of the DPS
, member of the DPS
, member of the DPS
, member of the DPS; Mayor of Dulovo municipality
, former member of the DPS
, member of the DPS
Emel Etem Toshkova,  member of the DPS party; former deputy Prime Minister of Bulgaria (2005–09)
Ahmet Fikri Tüzer, Turkish politician; Prime Minister of Turkey (1942) (born in Shumen)
, member of the DPS

Religion
Süleyman Hilmi Tunahan, Islamic theologist

Sports

 
 
 
 
 
 
 
 
 

Ismail Abilov, Olympic wrestler 
Emin Ahmed, football player 
, Turkish wrestler (born in Ottoman Ludogorie) 
Lyutvi Ahmedov, Olympic wrestler
Reyhan Arabacıoğlu, Turkish Olympic weightlifter  
Samet Ashimov, football player
Beysim Beysim, football player 
Şenol Can, Turkish football player and manager of Fatih Karagümrük S.K. (born in Kardzhali) 
Şevket Candar, Turkish football player (born in Shumen)
Ekrem Celil,  Turkish European champion weightlifter (born in Kardzhali)
Said Chifudov, wrestler
Beyhan Çalışkan, Turkish football player (born in Ruse)
Ali Ahmet Çapraz, wrestler
Mecnur Çolak, Turkish football player (born in Razgrad) 
Demir Demirev, weightlifter 
Basri Dirimlili, Turkish football player (born in Silistra)
Aksel Gürcan Demirtaş, Turkish sprinter (born in Varna)
Osman Duraliev, Olymipic wrestler
, Turkish football player (born in Kardzhali)
Mehmed Fikretov, weightlifter
Ekrem Genç, football player 
Zekeriya Güçlü, wrestler 
Fedail Güler,  Turkish World Champion weightlifter (born in Bulgaria) 
Sibel Güler, Turkish taekwondo practitioner (born in Bulgaria) 
Gürhan Gürsoy, football player
Mehmet Hacıoğlu, Turkish football player and coach (born in Plovdiv) 
Nurullah Hasan, Ottoman wrestler (born in Shumen) 
Ahmed Hikmet, football player
Soner Hyusein, football player 
Hergeleci Ibrahim, Turkish oil wrestler (born in Ezerche)
Murad Ibrahim, football player 
Said Ibraimov, football player and coach of FC Tobol
Ismail Isa, football player 
Hasan Isaev, Olympic wrestler
Yusuf İsmail, Ottoman wrestler (born in Shumen) 
Arhan Isuf, football player 
, Ottoman wrestler
Eray Karadayi, football player 
Birsent Karagaren, football player who plays for the Bulgaria national football team
Alper Kasapoğlu, Turkish Olympic athlete (born in Razgrad)
Myumyun Kashmer, football player 
, Turkish football player (born in Plovdiv)
, Turkish football player (born in Haskovo)
Dzhihat Kyamil, football player
Kızılcıklı Mahmut, Turkish wrestler (born in Silistra) 
Teynur Marem, football player 
Husein Mehmedov, Olympic wrestler
Bahar Mert, Turkish volleyball player (born in Kardzhali)
Mesut Mert, Canadian football coach 
Said Mustafov, Olympic wrestler 
Halil Mutlu, Turkish Olympic weightlifter (born in (Momchilgrad) 
Tezdzhan Naimova, sprinter 
Emin Nouri, Swedish and Azerbaijani football player (born in Kardzhali) 
Filiz Osmanodja, German-born chess player (Turkish Bulgarian parents)
Gülümser Öney, Turkish chess player (born in Pleven)
Nesim Özgür, football player
Semavi Özgür, Turkish football player (born in Bulgaria) 
Yılmaz Özlem, Turkish football player (born in Bulgaria) 
Neriman Özsoy, Turkish volleyball player (born in Razgrad) 
Erdoğan Partener, Turkish Olympic basketball player (born in Plovdiv)
Cahit Paşa, Turkish football player (born in Kardzhali) 
, Turkish wrestler (born in Ottoman Kardzhali)
, Ottoman wrestler (born in Shumen)
Kurtdereli Mehmet Pehlivan, Ottoman and Turkish wrestler (born in Bukurovo)
, football player 
Ismet Ramadan, football player 
Bekir Rasim, football player 
Shener Remzi, football player
Ruzhdi Ruzhdi, Paralympian track and field athlete
Erol Sabanov, German-born football player (Turkish Bulgarian parents)
Ayan Sadakov, former football player
Çetin Sadula, football player
Nezir Sağır Turkish Olympic weightlifter (born in Isperih) 
Taner Sağır, Turkish World and Olympic weightlifting champion (born in Kardzhali) 
Dormushali Safet Saidhodzha, football player
Salim Salimov, Olympic boxer
Edis Seliminski, football player 
Nermedin Selimov, Olympic wrestler
Yakup Sertkaya, Turkish football player (born in Kardzhali) 
Shaban Shefket, football player 
İlyas Şükrüoğlu, Turkish Olympic wrestler (born in Kardzhali) 
Naim Süleymanoğlu, Turkish World and Olympic weightlifter (born in Ptichar)
Aysel Taş, Turkish javelin thrower (born in Bulgaria) 
Serafim Todorov, Turkish boxer (born in Peshtera) 
Ertan Tombak, football player 
Zehra Topel, Turkish chess player (born in Shumen) 
, Turkish football player (born in Varna)
, Turkish football player (born in Kardzhali)
Gursel Veli, football player
Aykut Yanukov, football player 
Dzuneit Yashar, football player
Nevriye Yılmaz, Turkish basketball player (born in Plovdiv)
Yuksel Yumerov, football player 
Oktay Yusein, football player 
Serkan Yusein, football player 
Taybe Yusein, wrestler 
Nejdet Zalev, Olympic wrestler

Others
Türkan Feyzullah, 18-month-old baby shot by Bulgarian troops during an anti-Bulgarisation protest

See also 
Turks in Bulgaria
List of Bulgarians

References

Turks
!